The 2005 888.com Premier League was the first season of a Premier League Darts tournament organised by the Professional Darts Corporation. 

Phil Taylor, Colin Lloyd, Peter Manley, John Part, Roland Scholten, Wayne Mardle and wildcard entrant Mark Dudbridge were the seven players who competed in a round-robin tournament which had a total prize fund of £140,000 – with £50,000 going to the eventual winner.

Format
The Premier League started in Stoke-on-Trent on 20 January 2005 before moving around the country. The league system the players play each other twice over 12 legs, with two points for a win and one for a draw. All 12 legs were played regardless of whether a result had already been achieved. Phil Taylor achieved two 11–1 wins, although the last few legs were irrelevant to the match result. Legs played in these circumstances were known as 'dead legs'.

Venues
For the inaugural Premier League Darts event, all 11 venues used were in England.

Results

League stage

20 January – Week 1
King's Hall, Stoke-on-Trent

3 February – Week 2
Rivermead Centre, Reading

17 February – Week 3
Wellsprings Centre, Taunton

10 March – Week 4
Sports Village, Norwich

31 March – Week 5
Sands Centre, Carlisle

21 April – Week 6
Pavilions, Plymouth

28 April – Week 7
Glades Arena, Kidderminster

5 May – Week 8
Kingsway Leisure Centre, Widnes

12 May – Week 9
The Dome Leisure Centre, Doncaster

19 May – Week 10
Charter Hall, Colchester

Play-offs – 30–31 May
G-Mex, Manchester

Table and streaks

Table

NB: LWAT = Legs Won Against Throw. Players separated by +/- leg difference if tied.

Streaks

NB: W = Won
D = Drawn
L = Lost

Player statistics

The statistics shown are for the league stage only. Playoffs are not included.

External links
 Results & Averages for the 2005 888.com Premier League Darts
 Results for the 2005 888.com Premier League Darts
 Report on 2005 playoffs

Premier League Darts
Premier League Darts
Premier League Darts